The Pythian Castle is a historic 3-story brick and stone Knights of Pythias building located at 610-612 Court Street in Portsmouth, Virginia.  Built between 1897 and 1898 for the Atlantic Lodge, Knights of Pythias, it was designed by architect Edward Overman in the Romanesque Revival style of architecture.  Like many multistory urban fraternal buildings built in the late 19th and early 20th centuries, its street floor was rented out for retail and office spaces while the upper floors were reserved for lodge use.  In 1908 a single-story brick and stone Romanesque Revival addition was built to the north of the original building. In 1979 the Pythian Castle was sold by the knights.  On October 30, 1980, it was added to the National Register of Historic Places.  Today the ground floor is a Mexican eatery.

It is located in the Downtown Portsmouth Historic District.

References

Knights of Pythias buildings
Clubhouses on the National Register of Historic Places in Virginia
National Register of Historic Places in Portsmouth, Virginia
Buildings and structures in Portsmouth, Virginia
Romanesque Revival architecture in Virginia
Houses completed in 1898
Individually listed contributing properties to historic districts on the National Register in Virginia